Stormont-Dundas and Glengarry was an electoral riding in Ontario, Canada. It was created in 1975 by redistributing the riding of Glengarry and parts of the ridings of Stormont and Grenville-Dundas. In 1995, the riding was expanded to include part of Grenville, becoming the riding of Stormont-Dundas-Glengarry and East Grenville. In 1999, following a reduction in the number of provincial ridings from 130 to 103 by the Harris government, the riding was combined with Cornwall to create the riding of Stormont-Dundas-Charlottenburg.

Members of Provincial Parliament

References 

Former provincial electoral districts of Ontario